Tinus van Beurden (30 April 1893 – 29 May 1950) was a Dutch footballer. He played in one match for the Netherlands national football team in 1920, and thereby became the first Willem II player to gain an international cap.

Van Beurden played for Willem II between 1910 and 1926, making 126 appearances and scoring 47 goals. In the 1915–16 season, he was part of the Willem II team to win the Dutch league title as first team outside of the Randstad region.

Honours
Willem II
 Netherlands Football League Championship: 1915–16

References

1893 births
1950 deaths
Dutch footballers
Netherlands international footballers
Footballers from Tilburg
Association football forwards
Willem II (football club) players